Alan Monaghan (born May 6, 1970) is an Irish novelist. He has been shortlisted for the Irish Book Awards and has won the 2002 Hennessy New Irish Writer Award.

Life and works
Monaghan was born in Dublin where he served his apprenticeship as a boilermaker in the Guinness brewery before becoming an engineer.  He began his literary career in 1995 with the short story Rosary which was shortlisted for the Hennessy X.O Literary Awards.  This nomination was successfully followed in 2002 when Monaghan won the Hennessy New Irish Writer Award  and the Award for Emerging Fiction for his short story The Soldier's Song. Monaghan has developed this short story into a series of books the first of which, The Soldier's Song was published in 2010.

Monaghan has been highly praised for his writing style and was nominated in the Best Newcomer category of the 2010 Irish Book Awards.

Personal life
Monaghan continues to live in Dublin with his family.

Bibliography
Fiction
Rosary (1995)
The Soldier's Song (2002)
The Soldier's Song (2010)

References

External links
Marsh Agency, Alan Monaghan 
 Sunday Tribune Article on Hennessy X.O Awards
Sunday Business Post Article mentions follow up novel to The Soldier's Song

1970 births
Living people
Irish novelists
People from County Dublin
Irish boilermakers
Irish male novelists